Nish may refer to:
Anishinaabe, a group of culturally related indigenous peoples in what is known today as Canada and the United States
National Institute of Speech and Hearing, an education and research institute in Kerala, India
 Nesh, Afghanistan, a village in Kandahar Province, Afghanistan
 Niš, a city in Serbia
 Sanjak of Niš, a sanjak of the Ottoman Empire
 SourceAmerica (formerly NISH), an American non-profit disability organization

People 
 Nish Bruce (1956–2002), British soldier and author
 Colin Nish (born 1981), Scottish footballer
 David Nish (born 1947), British footballer
 David Nish (businessman) (born 1960), British businessman
 Ian Nish (1926–2022), British academic and Japanologist
 Nish Kumar (born 1985), British stand-up comedian, actor, and radio presenter 
 Mike Nish (born 1959), American racing driver
 Nish Selvadurai (born 1978), Australian comedian